John Frederic Ryland was an Irish Anglican priest.

Ryland was born in Waterford and educated at Trinity College, Dublin. After curacies in Elstead and Waithe he was Rector of Tallow, County Waterford. He was Archdeacon of Lismore from 1869  to 1896.

Notes

Church of Ireland priests
Archdeacons of Lismore
Alumni of Trinity College Dublin
19th-century Irish Anglican priests